Moin is a greeting in Frisian and German dialects.

Moin may also refer to:

People

Given name
 Moin (singer), Iranian singer
 Moin Akhter (1950–2011), Pakistani actor and comedian
 Moin Khan (born 1971), former Pakistani cricketer

Surname
 Mohammad Moin (1914–1971), Iranian scholar of Persian literature and Iranology
 Mostafa Moin (born 1951), Iranian politician
 Parviz Moin (born 1952), director of a research laboratory at the Stanford University

Places 
 Moin, Gevgelija, North Macedonia
 Moín, Costa Rica, a terminal port in the Limón province

Other uses
 Moin (mythology), a serpent in Norse mythology
 MoinMoin, a wiki engine
 Moin moin, Nigerian cuisine
 Moin (band), a British music band

See also
 Moeen, a given name and surname
 Moinabad (disambiguation)